Hugo Villi Kukke (1 March 1898, in Pala Parish (now Peipsiääre Parish), Kreis Dorpat – 3 August 1942, Sverdlovsk, Russian SFSR) was an Estonian politician and newspaper editor. He was a member of the IV Riigikogu and V Riigikogu.

From 1932 until 1933, he was Minister of Education and Social Affairs. Following the Soviet occupation of Estonia in 1940, Kukke was arrested in Tallinn in 1941 and sentenced to death by a military tribunal of the USSR. He was executed in Sverdlovsk in 1942.

References

1898 births
1942 deaths
People from Peipsiääre Parish
People from Kreis Dorpat
Estonian People's Party politicians
National Centre Party (Estonia) politicians
Patriotic League (Estonia) politicians
Education and Social affairs ministers of Estonia
Members of the Riigikogu, 1929–1932
Members of the Riigikogu, 1932–1934
Members of the Estonian National Assembly
Members of the Riigivolikogu
20th-century Estonian lawyers
University of Tartu alumni
Estonian military personnel of the Estonian War of Independence
Recipients of the Order of the White Star, 2nd Class
Estonian people executed by the Soviet Union
Gulag detainees